Lagupie is a commune in the Lot-et-Garonne department in south-western France.

See also
Communes of the Lot-et-Garonne department

References

Communes of Lot-et-Garonne